Huanren Manchu Autonomous County (Mölendroff: huwanren manju beye dasangga siyan), formerly Huairen County, is a county under the administration of Benxi City, in eastern Liaoning province, People's Republic of China, bordering Jilin to the east. It is also one of 11 Manchu autonomous counties and one of 117 autonomous counties nationally. As a county, Huanren was established in 1877. It was reorganised as an autonomous county in 1989 with approval of the State Council.

Administrative divisions
Huanren County is divided into 13 Subdivisions: one subdistrict, eight towns and four townships including one ethnic township. The main nationalities are Manchu, Han, Hui and  Korean people.

Subdistrict:
Baguacheng

Towns:
Huanren
Gucheng
Erpengdianzi
Shajianzi
Wulidianzi
Hualai
Muyuzi
Balidianzi
Pulebao

Townships:
Xiangyang
Yahe
Heigou
Beidianzi

Climate
Huanren has a monsoon-influenced humid continental climate (Köppen Dwa) with hot and humid summers and rather long, cold, and very dry winters. More than two-thirds of the annual rainfall occurs from June thru August.

Tourism
Wunu Mountain City, a Goguryeo site found in this county, is part of the combined UNESCO World Heritage Site that also includes sites in Ji'an, Jilin.

References

External links
Official website of Huanren County government

 
County-level divisions of Liaoning
Manchu autonomous counties
Benxi